The 2009/10 MTN40 was a domestic List A cricket championship in South Africa. This was the 29th time the championship was contested. Each team plays each other twice in a home and away leg. The top four teams progress to the semi-finals, with the winners of the semi-finals going through to the final. Cricket South Africa has introduced trial rule changes; 40 overs per side, the batting team choosing powerplays, 12 players per side (rolling subs). The tournament has been rebranded from the MTN Domestic Championship to the MTN 40.

The competition started on 28 October 2009 and the final took place on 29 January 2010.

Teams
 Nashua Cape Cobras in Cape Town & Paarl
 Nashua Dolphins in Durban & Pietermaritzburg
 Gestetner Diamond Eagles in Bloemfontein & Kimberley
 bizhub Highveld Lions in Johannesburg and Potchefstroom
 Nashua Titans in Centurion & Benoni
 Chevrolet Warriors in East London & Port Elizabeth

Stadiums

Group stage

Points table

Point system
 Win: 4 points
 Tie, no result or abandoned: 2 points
 Loss: 0 points
 Bonus points: 1 point awarded if the run rate is sufficiently higher than that of the opposition.

Knockout stage

Semi-finals

Final

References

External links 
 Series home at ESPN Cricinfo

South African domestic cricket competitions
2009–10 South African cricket season